Eupithecia rubellicincta is a moth in the family Geometridae. It is found in Brazil.

References

Moths described in 1904
rubellicincta
Moths of South America